Keely Brown (born in Kitchener, Ontario), is a former Canadian national level athlete who played ringette, roller in-line hockey as a goaltender. She played for the Canadian Senior National Ringette Team and was also a goalie on the Canadian Women's National Inline Hockey team. Brown also played semi-professional ringette and semi-pro women's ice hockey. Brown currently works 
for the National Hockey League's, Edmonton Oilers as a Senior Legal Counsel, and works for the Oilers Entertainment Group (OEG).

As a ringette player, Brown won the gold at the World Ringette Championships in 2002 playing goalie for Team Canada and the silver medal three times. She also helped create the National Ringette League and played for the Edmonton WAM!. In women's ice hockey, Brown played varsity level in Canada, played in Canada's Western Women's Hockey League, and in the National Women's Hockey League (NWHL, 1999–2007). In the late 1990s, Brown had also helped merge women's hockey leagues from Ontario and Quebec to form Canada's now defunct NWHL.

Apart from her athletic achievements, Brown also contributed significantly to the development of ringette equipment. Brown is recognized for her role in helping to develop the Keely glove, which was designed to provide better protection and grip for ringette goalies.

Early life
Keely Brown was born and raised in Canada and displayed a keen interest in sports at an early age, taking up ringette, a sport that was gaining popularity in the country. She eventually honed her skills as an ice hockey goaltender and then broadened her experience by participating in in-line hockey.

Education
Brown completed a four-year undergraduate degree in psychology and criminology with a women's studies minor at the University of Toronto, after which she went on to Osgoode Hall Law School and was admitted to the Ontario Bar in 2003.

Ringette

Early career
Before moving to Alberta, Keely grew up playing ringette in the province of Ontario in Kitchener, Waterloo, and Sudbury. Keely competed in 19 Canadian Ringette Championships, winning nine gold and eight silver medals.

Team Canada ringette
Brown spent 14 years competing as a national ringette goalie for the Canadian senior national ringette team from 1998 - 2012. She competed in five World Ringette Championships, winning one gold and four silver medals. Keely served as the senior goalie coach for Team Canada at the 2013 World Ringette Championships and the goalie coach for Team Canada U19 West at the 2012 World Junior Ringette Championships.

National Ringette League
After moving to Alberta, she joined the Edmonton WAM! of the National Ringette League for ten years, a league which she helped create.

Keely glove

Apart from her achievements on the ice, Brown also worked to improve ringette goaltending equipment. She found that available equipment did not provide adequate protection or grip for ringette goaltenders. Brown collaborated with a company called McKenney to develop a new ringette goalie trapper, known colloquially as "the Keely glove", that addressed these issues. The Keely glove was a significant advancement in ringette goaltending equipment, is still used by many athletes today, and has been developed for both senior and junior goalies. In 2021, a custom Keely glove was created for Callie Bizuk, a one-armed ringette goalie from Alberta.

Ringette goalie school
Keely Brown, along with Heather Konkin, established their own company called 5-Count Ringette Goalie Instruction. The company had a team of 25 skilled instructors who provided top-tier goalie training for ringette players all over Canada. The company's range of services encompassed goalie camps, clinics, and ice times, which were held from British Columbia to Prince Edward Island. Their main aim was to offer exceptional training to ringette goalies of all ages and abilities. Additionally, Brown authored a book titled "The Complete Guide to Ringette Goaltending."

Inline Hockey
Brown's skills as a goalie were recognized early on. Brown started playing inline hockey ( roller hockey) during her first year of university and eventually joined the Canadian Women's National Inline Hockey team. She helped the team win a gold medal at the 2002 FIRS Inline Hockey World Championships held in Rochester, New York. During her inline career, she helped Canada win 4 gold medals: in 2002, 2004, and 2005 as Team Canada goaltender, and finally two golds as one of the team's assistant coaches in 2012 and 2016.

Ice hockey

High school
Brown made history as the first female to play high school boys hockey in Central Western Ontario where she played as a goaltender.

Canadian varsity
To further her career, Brown decided to join the University of Toronto's varsity hockey program, playing in the 1999-2000 season for the Toronto Varsity Blues women's ice hockey team.

Semi-professional
After playing for the Scarborough Sting and Mississauga Ice Bears in the National Women's Hockey League (NWHL) for a few years, she transitioned to play for the Edmonton Chimos in the Western Women's Hockey League. Moreover, Brown played an instrumental role in merging women's hockey leagues from Ontario and Quebec to form the National Women's Hockey League (1999–2007) in the late 1990s.

Personal life and legacy
Brown is recognized as one of the greatest goaltenders in both ringette and women's inline hockey. She was inducted into the Ringette Canada Hall of Fame in 2014 in the Athlete category. She was inducted into the
Alberta Sports Hall of Fame in 2008. Brown continues to promote and develop ringette and other sports.

References

Sources
 "Keely Brown". Ringette Canada Hall of Fame. Retrieved November 9, 2021.
 "World Champion" (PDF). Ringette Canada. Retrieved November 9, 2021.
 "Keely Brown" (PDF). Ringette Alberta. Retrieved November 9, 2021.
 "Keely Brown, First-Time Coach & Mentor". Hockey Canada. Retrieved November 9, 2021.
 "Oilers Prospects: Keely Brown". Edmonton Journal. Retrieved November 9, 2021.

Living people
Ringette players
Sportspeople from Ontario
Canadian sportswomen